Tenny Tatoi Palepoi (born December 19, 1990) is a former American football defensive tackle. He first enrolled at Snow College before transferring to the University of Utah. Palepoi attended Skyline High School in Holladay, Utah. His brother, Anton Palepoi, also played in the NFL.

Early years
Palepoi was born on December 19, 1990 in Salt Lake City, Utah. He played high school football for the Skyline High School Eagles. He first-team all-state in 2008 as a senior and honorable mention all-state in 2007. He was also team captain and an all-region selection his junior and senior years.

College career
Palepoi played for the Snow College Badgers from 2010 to 2011. He was a NJCAA All-American, first-team All-WSFL selection, and team captain his sophomore year in 2011.

Palepoi transferred and played football for the Utah Utes of the University of Utah from 2012 to 2013. He was a second-team All-Pac-12 selection and team captain his senior year. He recorded 74 tackles, 12.5 tackles for loss and 6.5 sacks at the University of Utah.

Professional career

San Diego / Los Angeles Chargers
Palepoi was signed by the San Diego Chargers on May 13, 2014 after going undrafted in the 2014 NFL Draft. He made his NFL debut on September 8, 2014 against the Arizona Cardinals, recording one tackle. He was ruled out for the 2015 season with a fractured foot on August 3, 2015.

Palepoi was suspended four games on December 12, 2016 for violating the NFL policy on performance-enhancing substances.

On March 20, 2017, Palepoi re-signed with the Chargers.

Buffalo Bills
On April 16, 2018, Palepoi signed a one-year contract with the Buffalo Bills. He was released on July 25, 2018. He was re-signed on August 19, 2018, only to be released four days later.

Salt Lake Stallions
On December 22, 2018, Palepoi signed with the Salt Lake Stallions of the Alliance of American Football. The league ceased operations in April 2019.

In the 2020 XFL Draft, Palepoi was selected by the Seattle Dragons.

References

External links
NFL Draft Scout
College stats

Living people
1990 births
Players of American football from Salt Lake City
American football defensive tackles
American football defensive ends
American sportspeople of Samoan descent
Snow Badgers football players
Utah Utes football players
San Diego Chargers players
Los Angeles Chargers players
Buffalo Bills players
Salt Lake Stallions players